Kenya Broadcasting Corporation (KBC) is the state-run media organisation of Kenya. It broadcasts in English and Swahili, as well as in most local languages of Kenya. The corporation started its life in 1928 when Kenya was a British colony. It was the first station in Kenya. In 1964, when Kenya became an independent country, the corporation's name was changed to Voice of Kenya. In 1989, the Kenyan parliament reverted the corporation's name from Voice of Kenya to Kenya Broadcasting Corporation.

During the rule of president Daniel arap Moi, KBC became the mouthpiece of the government. Each broadcast opened with a piece on what the president had been doing that day. Under the then president, Mwai Kibaki, KBC took a more objective approach. The corporation helped most of Kenya's notable journalists especially before the liberalization of the airwaves in Kenya. The pioneer broadcasters post independence were Maurice Mwendah (TV), Simeon Ndesanjo (Radio), Dalail Mzee (Radio), Aziz Yakub, (Radio & TV), and Aish Jenneby (TV).

English service broadcasters who pioneered the service were Peter Clare, David Kelly, Hassan Mazoa, Sammy Lui, Norbert Okare, and Martin Billy Mutta, followed later by Peter Njoroge Mwaura, Elizabeth Omolo, Esther Kanyago, Yakub Ishaq, Amos Njogu amongst many.

In the 80s and 90s names such as Khamisi Themor, Leornard Mambo Mbotela, Omuga Kabisae, Ngulamu Mwaviro, and Enacled Araba, were also heard. The English service had its share of KIMC graduates, Serah Kihara, Gladys Erude. John Karani Wanjiru Kago Johnstone Omurunga, also opportunities were accorded to other KBC Technical employees such as Ike Mulembo,William Kiamba,Larry Wambua and others on the English Service.

After many decades of dominance in the Kenyan market, KBC has been overtaken in programming content and ratings, especially with the advent of  private TV stations and digital satellite television in the early 2000s. These new platforms brought more content options by airing classic TV shows (sitcoms, action thriller series, weekend movie nights), more children's entertainment (more allocation time and wide variety), and more refined local content. 

KBC aired the popular Vitimbi comedy and drama show for more than 30 years before the show was taken off air on the national broadcaster in 2015.

History of KBC 
 1924: English radio broadcasting began. The broadcasts targeted white settlers who monitored news from their home and other parts of the world.
 The first radio broadcasts targeting Africans came during the Second World War to inform parents and relatives of African soldiers what was happening at the war front.
 1953: The first broadcast service was created for Africans. African Broadcasting Services carried programmes in Kiswahili, Dholuo, Kikuyu, Kinandi, Kiluhya, Kikib and Arabic.
 1954: Kenya Broadcasting Services was established. Regional stations were set up in Mombasa (Sauti ya Mvita), Nyeri (Mount Kenya Station) and Kisumu (Lake Station).
 1961: Kenya Broadcasting Corporation was formed to take over broadcasting services from the government controlled Kenya Broadcasting Services.
 1962: Television was introduced in Kenya.
 1 July 1964: Kenya Broadcasting Corporation was nationalised into Voice of Kenya through an Act of Parliament.
 1978: Kenya television transitioned to colour.
 1980: a new television station opened in Mombasa to relay programmes and produce local dramas, music, cultural and other programmes
 1989: the Voice of Kenya changed back to Kenya Broadcasting Corporation through an Act of Parliament.
 1989: a contract was signed between KBC and Japan Telecommunications Engineering consultancy service (JETC) for improvement and expansion of the national medium wave frequency radio broadcasting network.
 1991: KBC signed a contract with Marubeni Corporation of Tokyo, Japan for upgrading of medium wave transmitting stations and construction of new ones.
 1993: KBC embarked on a major modernisation project to upgrade its transmitting station, construct new ones and improve on switching and routing network.
 1996: KBC commissioned Metro FM as a 90% music radio.
 September 2000: KBC commissioned Metro Television as a sports and entertainment channel.
 December 2000: KBC started Coro FM, transmitting in Kikuyu language to Nairobi and Mount Kenya Region.
 2001: Pwani FM was started to cater to the Coast Region.
 2009: Signet subsidiary is first launched.
2021: KBC TV rebranded. A line-up of changes were unveiled, including a new logo. The station brought on board fresh faces and returned former news presenters including Catherine Kasavuli, Fayyaz Qureishi, Badi Muhsin, and Pauline Sheghu.

Radio stations

Programs

Current

Imported shows

Animated shows
 Arthur

Soap Opera
 Corazon miente

Former

Domestic shows

Gospel
 Joy Bringers
 Sing and Shrine

Soap Opera
 Tausi

Children's
 Children's Variety Show

Comedy
 Classmates
Kinyonga
Vioja Mahakamani

Magic
 Kiini Macho

Imported shows

Animated shows
 The Adventures of Blinky Bill
 The Adventures of Don Coyote and Sancho Panda
 The Adventures of Tintin
 Aladdin
 Animaniacs
 Avenger Penguins
 The Bear, the Tiger and the Others
 Beast Wars: Transformers
 Bonkers
 The California Raisin Show
 Captain Caveman and the Teen Angels
 Captain Planet and the Planeteers
 The Care Bears
 The Centurions
 Challenge of the GoBots
 Chip 'n Dale: Rescue Rangers
 Count Duckula
 Danger Mouse
 Darkwing Duck
 Denver, the Last Dinosaur
 Disney's Adventures of the Gummi Bears
 Dogtanian and the Three Muskehounds
 Doris
 Double Dragon
 The Dreamstone
 DuckTales
 The Flintstones
 The Flying House
 Freakazoid!
 Gadget Boy & Heather
 Galactik Football
 Gargoyles
 Hammerman
 He-Man and the Masters of the Universe
 Hurricanes
 Huxley Pig
 Inspector Gadget
 Jonny Quest
 Karate Kommandos
 Krazy Kat
 The Little Mermaid
 Lucky Luke
 Madeline
 The Magic School Bus
 The Magical Adventures of Quasimodo
 The Magical World of Gigi
 Mega Man
 The Mighty Hercules
 The New Adventures of Flash Gordon
 The New Adventures of Winnie the Pooh
 New Kids on the Block
 Nilus the Sandman
 Pingu
 Popeye the Sailor Man
 Princess Knight
 ProStars
 The Raggy Dolls
 Rambo: The Force of Freedom
 The Road Runner Show
 Roger Ramjet
 Rupert
 Saber Rider and the Star Sheriffs
 Sagwa, the Chinese Siamese Cat
 Samurai Pizza Cats
 Sandokan
 Scooby-Doo, Where Are You!
 She-Ra: Princess of Power
 SilverHawks
 Sky Dancers
 The Smurfs
 Sonic the Hedgehog
 Spartakus and the Sun Beneath the Sea
 Spider-Man
 Spider-Woman
 Spiff and Hercules
 Sport Billy
 Star Street: The Adventures of the Star Kids
 Street Fighter
 Street Sharks
 Superbook
 SWAT Kats: The Radical Squadron
 TaleSpin
 Taz-Mania
 Team Galaxy
 Teen Wolf
 ThunderCats
 Tic Tac Toons
 Tom and Jerry
 Top Cat
 Transformers
 Victor & Hugo: Bunglers in Crime
 Voltron
 Wacky Races
 The Wizard of Oz
 Woody Woodpecker
 The Woody Woodpecker Show

Children's Programmes
 The Adventures of Shirley Holmes
 Akili and Me
 Atlantis High
 Bernard's Watch
 The Borrowers
 BJ's Teddy Bear Club and Bible Stories
 Brum
 Butterfly Island
 Button Moon
 The Dooley and Pals Show
 The KangaZoo Club
 Mowgli: The New Adventures of the Jungle Book
 The Longhouse Tales
 Ocean Girl
 Perspective
 Power Rangers
 Ragdolly Anna
 Raggs
 Sesame Street
 Skippy the Bush Kangaroo
 Space Academy
 Spellbinder
 Super Gran
 Thomas and Friends
 Ubongo Kids

Comedy
 ALF
 Butterflies
 Desmond's
 The Dick Van Dyke Show
 Dinosaurs
 Everybody Loves Raymond
 The Fresh Prince of Bel-Air
 Full House
 Good Times
 The Jeffersons
 The Lenny Henry Show
 Mind Your Language
 Monty
 The New Leave It to Beaver
 One on One
 Parker Lewis Can't Lose
 The Parkers
 Perfect Strangers

Drama
 18 Wheels of Justice
 21 Jump Street
 The Adventures of Sinbad
 Conan the Adventurer
 The Crow: Stairway to Heaven
 Danger Bay
 Derrick
 Doctor Who
 Dr. Quinn, Medicine Woman
 Five Mile Creek
 The Flash
 Flipper
 The Fugitive
 Hardcastle & McCormick
 Hill Street Blues
 Inspector Rex
 Kojak 
 Midsomer Murders
 Moonlighting
 Night Man
 North of 60
 One West Waikiki
 Oz
 Relic Hunter
 Remington Steele
 RoboCop: The Series
 Star Trek: The Original Series 
 Street Hawk 
 Tarzán
 The Saint 
 The Legend of William Tell
 Tropical Heat
 V 
 Walker, Texas Ranger
 Wonder Woman 
 Zorro

News
 The 700 Club

Telenovelas
 Escrava Isaura

Soap Opera
 A Country Practice
 Dallas
 Falcon Crest 
 Knots Landing
 Santa Barbara
 Step by Step

Reality
 The Oprah Winfrey Show

Anthology
 Murder Most Horrid

References

External links
 Kenya Broadcasting home page

Companies of Kenya
Mass media in Kenya
Television stations in Kenya
Radio stations in Kenya
Government-owned companies of Kenya
Multilingual broadcasters
British Kenya
Radio stations established in 1953
1953 establishments in Kenya
Television channels and stations established in 1962